Lenier Eunice Peró Justiz (24 November 1992) is a Cuban professional boxer. As an amateur, he won a gold medal at both the 2011 and 2015 Pan American Games, whilst also competing at the 2016 Olympics.
Dainier Peró, also a southpaw who won the Pan Am Games super heavyweight title and unsuccessfully competed at the Olympics, is his younger brother.

Amateur career

Olympic result
Rio 2016
Round of 16: Defeated Guido Vianello (Italy) 3–0
Quarter-finals: Defeated by Filip Hrgović (Croatia) TKO

Pan American Games results
2011 Guadalajara
Quarter-finals: Defeated Steven Couture (Canada) 22–2
Semi-finals: Defeated Yamil Peralta (Argentina) 13–9
Final: Defeated Julio Castillo (Ecuador) 16–10

2015 Toronto
Quarter-finals: Defeated Kieshno Major (Bahamas) 3–0
Semi-finals: Defeated Cam Awesome (USA) 2–1
Final: Defeated Edgar Muñoz (Venezuela) 2–1

Youth Olympics results
2010 Singapore
Preliminaries: Defeated Joshua Temple (USA) RSC
Semi-finals: Defeated Umit Can Patir (Turkey) 6–0
Final: Defeated Fabio Turchi (Italy) RSCH

Professional career 
Peró made his professional debut on 25 May 2019 against Maksym Pedyura. Peró knocked his opponent down twice en route to securing a first round, technical knockout victory.

After amassing a 3–0 record throughout the rest of 2019, Pero faced Jorge Alejandro Arias for the vacant WBA Fedelatin heavyweight title on 11 December 2020. He won the fight by a second-round knockout. Pero made his first title defense against Dumar Carrascal on 26 June 2021. He made quick work of his opponent, stopping Carrascal in just 111 seconds.

Pero faced Geovany Bruzon on 1 January 2022, on the undercard of the Luis Ortiz and Charles Martin pay-per-view bout. He won the fight by unanimous decision. Although Premier Boxing Champions head Al Haymon stated he would sign the winner of the bout, he announced that he had signed both fighters. Pero next faced Hector Perez in the main event of a FITE TV broadcast card, which took place at the Seminole Hard Rock Hotel & Casino Hollywood in Hollywood, Florida on 7 May 2022. He retained the WBA Fedelatin title by a third-round technical knockout. Pero faced the journeyman Joel Caudle in a stay-busy fight on 20 August 2022. He made quick work of his opponent, as he won by a first-round knockout.

On Feb 12, 2023 he pulled an upset over a previously professionally unbeaten two-time Amateur World Champion Victor Vykhryst with continuous body shots that broke the latter by the 8th round.

Professional boxing record

References

External links

 
 
 
 Junior World Championships 2010

1992 births
Living people
Sportspeople from Camagüey
Cuban male boxers
Heavyweight boxers
Olympic boxers of Cuba
Boxers at the 2010 Summer Youth Olympics
Boxers at the 2016 Summer Olympics
Pan American Games gold medalists for Cuba
Pan American Games medalists in boxing
Boxers at the 2011 Pan American Games
Boxers at the 2015 Pan American Games
Youth Olympic gold medalists for Cuba
Medalists at the 2011 Pan American Games
Medalists at the 2015 Pan American Games
21st-century Cuban people